María Lilja Þrastardóttir Kemp (born 1 September 1986) Is an Icelandic politician, student lawyer, journalist, author and activist. 
Maria founded “Slut Walk” in Iceland – a movement against sexual violence. “Slut Walk” has since 2011 grown into one of Reykjavik’s biggest events of the summer. In the past years, María mainly worked in the media world as an investigative journalist at Iceland’s largest newspaper Frettabladid. Since then she continued in the broadcast genre and became a television reporter on Islands Kanal 2 News. At the time she also had her own radio program that focused on women in the music. Maria took a break from journalism in early 2014 to serve as campaign manager for Mr. Dagur B. Eggertsson, who then became mayor of Reykjavik. Later that year, she co-founded and edited a music magazine for the Icelandic music scene called DV music.
In 2016 María published her first bestseller book in Iceland and the follow-up came out in 2020.
María studies business law at Bifröst university and is a member of the socialist party in 3rd place in Reykjavík in the coming parliamentary elections in Iceland, 2021. 

She is married to Orri Páll Dýrason, the former drummer of the band Sigur Rós.
They have four children and a dog and live in Reykjavík.

References

1986 births
Living people
Maria Lilja Thrastardottir
Maria Lilja Thrastardottir